Agapostemon femoratus is a species of sweat bee in the family Halictidae.

References

Further reading

External links

 

femoratus
Articles created by Qbugbot
Insects described in 1901